The Unsellables is a Canadian reality show that debuted on January 1, 2009. The show airs on HGTV. The Unsellables focuses on helping people who have trouble selling their home. There was also a British remake of the series.

Production
The Unsellables was written by Tim Grimes, Sarah Sked and Jenny Tryansky. The Unsellables is presented by Sofie Allsopp and is produced by Cineflix. Peter Warnica is the theme music composer of the series. Simon Lloyd, Kathleen Ruttan and Glen Salzman are the executive producers of the series. Micha Dahan and Josh Power does the cinematography on the show.
The series is directed by Catherine Annau, W.K. Davis, Danielle Kiraly, Allison Reid, Marc Simard, Karen Yarosky and Cheryl Zalameda. The series is edited by many people, this includes Gina Binetti, Ed Balevicius, Gerard Banning, Gerry Banning, Ryan Feldman, Sonia Godding, Mark Holtze, Eric Lambert, Burak Ozgan, Lindsay Ragone, Gad Reichman, Jeff Reynolds and Erinn Van Wynsberghe. Katherine Buck, Lorraine Clark, Sarah Sked and John Vandervelde are the people that produce the series.

Episodes
The host of The Unsellables is Sofie Allsopp. Sofie Allsopp is also a presenter on the British version of the series. Sofie is known as a British property expert turned television presenter. In addition to hosting the UK version of the series for the BBC, Sofie was formerly the property specialist on ITV’s daytime lifestyle programme This Morning. Her other television credits include More4 Channel’s Property Guide and Channel 4’s primetime special Britain’s Best & Worst Places to Live.

Season 1

Season 2

 aired summer 2012.

Media information

International broadcast

DVD/Blu-ray releases
The Unsellables was not released on DVD.

Online media
In America, people can currently watch the series on the online HGTV video player.
In Canada, people can currently watch the series on the online HGTV video player.

Syndication
In Canada, HGTV holds the national syndication rights, while BBC Canada hold cable rights.
In America, HGTV holds all the rights.

The Unsellables in other countries
The Unsellables (UK), presented by Sofie Allsopp and John Rennie, it aired on BBC One.

References

External links
Official website
Production website
The Unsellables at HGTV.com
The Unsellables at LifeStyle Home

English-language television shows
HGTV (Canada) original programming
2009 Canadian television series debuts
2010 Canadian television series endings
2010s Canadian reality television series
2000s Canadian reality television series